The Asijiki Coalition for the Decriminalisation of Sex Work (abbreviated "Asijiki Coalition") is a South Africa-based civil society coalition that advocates for the full decriminalisation of sex work in South Africa. The coalition was formed in August 2015 and consists of a membership of over 70 organisations including individual activists (such as Ayanda Denge), human rights defenders, lawyers, sex workers, and academics.

Member organisations 
Asijiki members include the Amnesty International, AIDS Healthcare Foundation, African Centre for Migration and Society, Desmond Tutu HIV Foundation, Commission for Gender Equality, COSATU, Doctors Without Borders (MSF-SA), Legal Resources Centre, UCT Gender Health and Justice Research Unit, One in Nine Campaign, Oxfam South Africa, Rape Crisis, Sexual and Reproductive Justice Coalition, Treatment Action Campaign (TAC), and many others.

Asijiki is the isiZulu word meaning 'no turning back' and the coalition was formed in an effort to safeguard the human rights of sex workers, and advocate for the full decriminalisation of sex work in South Africa. Several prominent non-governmental organisations in South Africa form the Steering Committee for the Asijiki Coalition. These organisations are: Sonke Gender Justice; Sex Workers Education and Advocacy Taskforce (SWEAT); Sisonke (National Sex Workers Movement in South Africa); and the Women's Legal Centre.

History 

Asijiki Coalition has made the news in South Africa on a number of occasions. The launch of the Asijiki Coalition garnered attention from several news outlets in South Africa, including Health24 which listed what was described as the 'shameful history' of sex worker murders in Cape Town and South Africa, and supported the Asijiki Coalition's work for full decriminalisation. In December 2015, individual members of the Asijiki Coalition gave testimony in South Africa's Gauteng Provincial Legislature, listing the difficulties and barriers that they face as a result of criminalisation of sex work in South African law. Asijiki Coalition has advocated on issues such as sex worker's access to healthcare, police harassment and assault of sex workers, the high incidence of murders of sex workers in South Africa, and other barriers experienced by sex workers as a result of the criminalisation of sex work. Through workshops, advocacy, and creative activism, Asijiki Coalition advocates for the full decriminalisation of sex work in South Africa - the coalition has specifically stated that for them, full decriminalisation means the decriminalisation of both sex worker and client such as the approach used in New Zealand, and not the Nordic model.

Activism 
Asijiki Coalition is active in both grassroots and high level advocacy efforts, as well as some notable examples of artistic or creative activism. In 2018, Asijiki partnered with the Central Methodist Mission on Greenmarket Square in central Cape Town to display a banner reading "Jesus was the first to decriminalise sex work". In 2019, the coalition presented a giant sunflower to South Africa's then newly elected President Cyril Ramaphosa to thank him for, and remind him of, commitments he had made to decriminalise sex work in South Africa. Asijiki was also actively involved in placing pressure on South Africa's Department of Justice and Constitutional Development's regarding the delay in publishing the final South African Law Reform Commission's report on sex work in South Africa, but was dismayed by the content of that final report. The Coalition engages with university groups, researchers, Chapter 9 institutions, as well as participating in more traditional forms of activism such as picketing and protest.

Asijiki Awards 

A further form of activism used by the Asijiki Coalition is the presentation of the Asijiki Awards. These awards are presented to allies as well as prominent public figures or organisations that have supported decriminalisation in South Africa. In 2016, the Asijiki Award for Courage & Initiative was presented to Sir Elton John at the 2016 International AIDS Conference in Durban. In 2019, the Asijiki Award for Solidarity & Hard Work, was presented to South Africa's #TotalShutdown Movement; and the Asijiki Award for Service & Humanity was presented to retired Constitutional Court Justice Edwin Cameron.

Gallery

See also 
 List of sex worker organizations

References

External links 

Human rights organisations based in South Africa
Prostitution in South Africa
Trade unions in South Africa
Sex worker organizations